is a fictional character in the anime and manga series Bleach created by Tite Kubo.

Character outline 
Yoruichi Shihōin is a woman who can transform into a black cat for long periods of time. She is intelligent and witty, and is intimately knowledgeable of Soul Society and its workings, as she was the former leader of the Stealth Forces and the 2nd division captain. Although of noble birth, she acts differently from other nobles. For instance, she instructed a young Soifon to call her by her first name instead of by her title, but reluctantly settled for being called "Yoruichi-sama" ("Lady Yoruichi" in the dub). She also transforms into her human form directly in front of Ichigo on several occasions just to see his reaction to seeing her naked, which she found decidedly humorous. Another note of her eccentricity is that she speaks in a dialect that elders use, such as identifying herself as 'washi' (a term that usually old men define themselves with) instead of more feminine terms like 'watashi' in both her human and animal forms (though specifically for the Japanese version).

Much like Kisuke Urahara, Yoruichi tends to avoid battles, preferring to help after a fight is over, but she will step in if she thinks her side cannot otherwise win. She was responsible for training Chad and Orihime prior to their entrance into Soul Society. She also supervised Ichigo Kurosaki's bankai training using the methods developed by Kisuke Urahara.

According to Tite Kubo, the author of Bleach, Yoruichi prefers to drink milk, which fits in with her practice of transforming into a cat, most of the time.

History 
While her age has not been revealed, she is older than Byakuya Kuchiki and refers to him as "Little Byakuya" since he was a kid. He called her "demon cat", and thought of himself as better than her in spite of her high status and rank; as a result, she was easily able to provoke him with her pranks. Yoruichi and Kisuke Urahara are best friends; as children, they played together every day under the Sōkyoku hill, in the training space that Urahara built when they were children, and later used the area to train together. Urahara also served under her command in 2nd Division as third seat before she recommended him for the position of the captain of 12th Division.

While Yoruichi was the stealth forces commander, she took in Soifon as a guard and became her mentor and friend. She taught Soifon most of the techniques she knew. As a result, Soifon succeeded her as head of the stealth forces after Yoruichi's escape from Soul Society. During her time in Soul Society, she created many techniques that involve flash steps, and taught some of them to Byakuya.

A century prior to the Bleach storyline, she helped Urahara, Tessai, and the Visoreds in their escape from Soul Society and abandoned her high status.

Synopsis 
Yoruichi first appears in feline form to deliver a warning to Urahara about the Soul Society moving to capture Rukia Kuchiki. After Rukia's capture, she helps train Orihime Inoue and Yasutora Sado to control their powers. She leads Ichigo's group into  Soul Society when they attempt to save Rukia, and then to Kūkaku Shiba when they were unable to enter through the Seireitei gates. After being separated from the group, Yoruichi collected information on Rukia's execution. She also rescues Ichigo from being injured by Byakuya's shikai and claims that he cannot fight as he is; she works to teach Ichigo the bankai of his zanpakutō using a technique developed by Urahara. Later, Yoruichi battles with Soifon, although with some struggle in the beginning. When Yoruichi reveals that she also is able to use shunko, Soifon is overcome with rage, and soon defeated. She cries and asks Yoruichi why she left her behind. Though the explanation is not shown, the two are reconciled. After Aizen's treachery is revealed, Yoruichi and Soifon capture and restrain him, but he and his accomplices escape via negacion. Yoruichi returns to the human world with Ichigo and his friends. 

Yoruichi, alongside Soifon, later actively begin to pursue the Bount once they learn of the Bount's plan to invade Soul Society, and also saves Ichigo when he is unable to defeat Jin Kariya. Yoruichi also rescued the Bount Koga Gō and took him to the home of Ran'tao, the Bount's creator, where he was nursed back to health. 

Subsequently, Yoruichi and Urahara rescue Ichigo from death at the hands of the arrancar Yammy.  Though she appears to easily defeat Yammy, it becomes apparent from her injuries afterward that her opponent was stronger than she expected due to his tough skin.  She appears again to take Orihime to the training room under Urahara's shop to prevent Aizen from gaining interest in her abilities.

Abilities 
As a member of a noble family and head of the stealth forces, Yoruichi has acquired many powerful abilities and artifacts. One of her most important and unique abilities is that she can shapeshift into a black cat at will. It is unknown if this ability possesses any time limit, but it is unlikely considering she has used it for so long that she is unused to her human form and dislikes wearing clothing (much to Ichigo's chagrin). As a cat, Yoruichi can still channel spiritual power and move with incredible speeds, though she is physically limited by the form. Her transformation also allows her a complete disguise in multiple ways; aside from the physical transformation, her voice as a cat is deep enough for most to assume that she is male.

Though this is by no means a unique skill, as most seated officers are capable of performing it to various degrees, Yoruichi holds the title  because she has mastered this ability to such an extent that she can appear to be in several places at once and wipe out entire stealth forces squadrons in moments. The full extent of her abilities remain unclear, but she was able to outrun Byakuya while carrying an unconscious Ichigo over her shoulder. She was able to perform around 300 steps before feeling out of breath; she states that it must be the result of being out of practice after doing so. 

It concentrates high-pressure kidō energy around the body, allowing it to be fired at opponents.

Yoruichi also taught Byakuya some techniques of her own creation involving flash steps, including one called utsusemi (空蝉, lit. cicada, in reference to their molting) which allows a person to move out of harm's way by creating another image of themselves. Yoruichi used a similar technique in her short battle with Byakuya, creating an image of her which was sliced by Byakuya, but appearing a split second later unharmed.

Two of Yoruichi's unique items are accessories that allow the user the power of flight. One is a small wand with a skull atop it. By channeling spirit energy into the wand, it produces a tentacle that acts as a harness and a single, bat-shaped wing that acts as a one-handed hang glider. No skill or previous experience is required to use it. The other, known as a tentōken (天踏絢, lit. heavenly dancing figure), is a brown mantle with a large draw string closure at the collar and a large brooch displaying the Shihōin family crest. Like the wand, the tentōken seems to require no skill or previous experience to use. It also seems to be superior to the wand, since it allows one to hover in mid-air and doesn't immobilize one of the user's hands.

Another item, though not in Yoruichi's possession, is the device used by Jūshirō Ukitake and Shunsui Kyōraku to destroy the Sōkyoku. It is a large, shield-like item with the Shihōin family crest stamped on it and a long cord connected to it. When the cord is wrapped around Sōkyoku and two zanpakutō are stabbed into two vertical slots running from its top, their energy flows through the cord and destroys Sōkyoku. Jūshirō Ukitake had it in his possession under some sort of seal.

Zanpakutō 
It is known that Yoruichi possesses a zanpakutō, but she relies nearly exclusively on hand to hand combat, shunkō and flash steps. However, although she never carries it during the main storyline, it is shown during a flashback when she tells Ichigo about Kisuke Urahara as the previous 12th division captain. She briefly uses a sword during the "Sealed Sword Frenzy" OVA to dispatch a hollow. She also uses it in the anime during Soifon's flashback about becoming Yoruichi's protégé, where it resembles a kodachi or wakizashi. In this scene, she is shown to have worn her zanpakutō horizontally down her back, in a similar fashion to how Soifon carries her own zanpakutō.

Reception 
She ranked 7th in the 3rd popularity poll, earning 3,744 votes, just 8 votes behind Byakuya Kuchiki and surpassing Kisuke Urahara by 68 votes.

Analysis 
Cortés Reslie discussed Yoruichi in the context of gender in anime, noting that she mixes the boundaries of genders as well as between humans and animals. Her ability to transform into a cat allows her to "escape sexual objectification in her animal form", while her "status as a fugitive and outlaw constructs her anamalistic body as a site of rebellion against the patriarchical order of the Gotei 13".. She also describes the relationship between Yoruichi and Suì Fēng as "the most richly described romantic (but not sexual) relationship in the series". Both women are portrayed as not ethnically Japanese; Suì Fēng is Chinese whereas Yoruichi, despite having a Japanese name, has dark caramel skin and golden eyes. However, Cortés Reslie also notes that their relationship, in which Suì Fēng is subservient to Yoruichi both on professional and personal level, "reflects real life global power dynamics bwtween China and Japan".

Louis Kemner writing for CBR described Yoruichi as Soul Society's "rogue hero", who cares about "about doing the right thing, at any cost". Levana-Jane Chester-Londt writing for Gamerant discussed how Yoruichi portrayal in Bleach "Set the new standard for black character representation" in manga and anime. She describes Yoruichi as s an influential mentor of the main character, and an attractive, down-to-earth princess who became a fan-favorite character.

Notes and references 

Anime and manga characters who can move at superhuman speeds
Anime and manga characters with superhuman strength
Bleach characters
Comics characters introduced in 2002
Female characters in anime and manga
Female soldier and warrior characters in anime and manga
Fictional characters with electric or magnetic abilities
Fictional commanders
Fictional female ninja
Fictional military captains
Fictional nobility
Fictional werecats

ru:Список персонажей «Bleach»#.D0.81.D1.80.D1.83.D0.B8.D1.82.D0.B8_.D0.A1.D0.B8.D1.85.D0.BE.D0.B8.D0.BD